Manole Aldescu (born 18 February 1929) was a Romanian cross-country skier who competed in the 1950s. He finished 10th in the 4 x 10 km event at the 1952 Winter Olympics in Oslo. He was born in Talea, Prahova County.

References

External links
 

1929 births
Year of death unknown
Romanian male cross-country skiers
Olympic cross-country skiers of Romania
Cross-country skiers at the 1952 Winter Olympics
Cross-country skiers at the 1956 Winter Olympics
People from Prahova County